This is a list of numbered roads in the County of Brant, in the Canadian province of Ontario. There are two classes of numbered roads in Brant County: county highways, former King's Highways downloaded to county responsibility in the late 1990s; and county roads, analogous to the county roads of other counties.

County Roads

Former county roads

County Highways
 

Brant